The Wiltz is a river flowing through Belgium and Luxembourg, joining the Sauer at Goebelsmuhle.  The Clerve is a tributary of the Wiltz.

External links

International rivers of Europe
Rivers of the Ardennes (Belgium)
Rivers of the Ardennes (Luxembourg)
Rivers of Belgium
Rivers of Luxembourg
Rivers of Luxembourg (Belgium)
Wiltz